Zeulenroda-Triebes is a German town in the district of Greiz in the state of Thuringia.

Zeulenroda-Triebes is situated in the south of Greiz in the mountains of the Thuringian Slate Mountains (Thüringer Schiefergebirge), on the border with Saxony. The population of Zeulenroda-Triebes in 2006 was about 18,000. The largest company is Bauerfeind AG. The most famous sight in the town is the neoclassical town hall, built in 1827. Zeulenroda-Triebes is also known for the International Thuringia Women's Cycling Tour.

Zeulenroda unt Bf station lies on the Werdau–Mehltheuer railway.

History
Zeulenroda was mentioned in a document as early as 1325. The village became a town in 1438. Zeulenroda belonged to the principality of the House of Reuss Elder Line for several centuries. On April 16, 1945 the United States Army took over Zeulenroda without a battle. On July 1 the Red Army occupied the town. In 1949 Zeulenroda and Triebes became a part of the German Democratic Republic. After German reunification in 1990, the Free State of Thuringia was reestablished. Zeulenroda merged with Triebes in 2006. The new name of the town is Zeulenroda-Triebes.

Population development
In 1908 the population of Zeulenroda reached the 10,000 mark. In 1946, the town had grown to more than 14,000 inhabitants through many resettlers. At the beginning of the 1990s more than 15,000 people lived in Zeulenroda. In recent years the number of inhabitants has declined slightly.

1830–2005 (Zeulenroda only)
 1830: 8,449
 1905: 9,776
 1910: 10,389
 1925: 11,047
 1933: 12,247
 1939: 12,688
 1946: 14,039 
 1950: 13,694 
 1960: 13,684
 1981: 14,709
 1995: 15,021
 2000: 14,600
 2005: 13,434

2005–2019 (Zeulenroda-Triebes)

 Data source: Thürigian State Statistics Center
1 before the merger of the two towns

Local council
The elections in May 2014 showed the following results:
CDU 11 seats
The Left 5 seats
SPD 3 seats
BIZ 2 seats
TV 2 seats
FDP 1 seat

BIZ means Bürgerinitiative für sozialverträgliche Abgaben und Leistungsgerechtigkeit in Zeulenroda und Umgebung e. V.
TV means: Wählergemeinschaft Thüringer Vogtland

Twin towns – sister cities

Zeulenroda-Triebes is twinned with:

 Giengen, Germany
 Kostelec nad Orlicí, Czech Republic
 Neunkirchen am Sand, Germany
 Nýřany, Czech Republic
 Sainte-Florine, France
 Wies, Austria

Notable people

Paul Herman Geithner (1902–1972), was born in Zeulenroda and immigrated with his parents to Philadelphia, Pennsylvania in 1908. His grandson, Timothy Geithner, was the 75th United States Secretary of the Treasury, serving under President Barack Obama.

Johann Christian Gottlieb Ackermann (1756–1801), physician
Gustav Schreck (1849–1918), Thomaskantor in Leipzig
Heinrich Seeling (1852–1932), architect
Fritz Wächtler (1891–1945), National Socialist politician
Gerd Schenker (born 1948), percussionist
Jürgen Raab (born 1958), football player and coach
Thomas Barth (born 1960), cyclist
Henning Bürger (born 1969), football player and coach
Doreen Dietel (born 1974), actress
Alexander John (born 1986), hurdler
René Enders (born 1987), track cyclist

References

External links

Official website 
Unofficial website
Landkreis Greiz

Towns in Thuringia
Greiz (district)
Principality of Reuss-Greiz